Sturzo is an Italian surname. Notable people with the surname include:

Luigi Sturzo (1871–1959), Italian Roman Catholic priest and politician, brother of Mario
Luigi Sturzo Institute
Mario Sturzo (1861–1941), Italian Roman Catholic bishop

Italian-language surnames